Miagrammopes mexicanus is a species of cribellate orb weaver in the spider family Uloboridae. It is found in the United States and Mexico.

References

Uloboridae
Articles created by Qbugbot
Spiders described in 1893
Spiders of the United States
Spiders of Mexico